William Henry Siddons (Quarter 3 1864 – 1893) was an English footballer who played in the Football League for Bolton Wanderers, Darwen and Walsall Town Swifts.  He had also been a regular with Birmingham St George's.  He died of congestion of the kidneys on 4 February 1893, aged just 29, having played for Redditch F.C. against Stourbridge F.C. the month before.

Early Career
Aged 19/20 Siddons signed for Aston Villa and was there in the 1884-1885 season. In 1885, aged 21/22 he signed for Birmingham Excelsior. Wikipedia records that 1885-86 was Birmingham Excelsior' best season winning the Birmingham Senior Cup. In 1886, aged 22/23 he was on the books of Mitchell St. George's. This was a club formed by two clubs amalgamating in 1886 (See Wikipedia article) and were active in the FA Cup. In 1888 Siddons headed North to Bolton Wanderers and played in  Football League.

References

1864 births
1893 deaths
English footballers
Aston Villa F.C. players
Birmingham Excelsior F.C. players
Birmingham St George's F.C. players
Bolton Wanderers F.C. players
Darwen F.C. players
Walsall F.C. players
English Football League players
Association football fullbacks